Patrick O'Sullivan (14 March 1818 – 29 February 1904) was a member of the Queensland Legislative Assembly.

Biography
O'Sullivan was born in Castlemaine, County Kerry, the son of William O'Sullivan, a soldier, and his wife Ellen (née Moriarty). O'Sullivan was also a soldier, and was stationed in London with his regiment when Queen Victoria succeeded to the throne in 1837. In January the next year, however, he was sentenced to fifteen years transportation for assault, thus missing the coronation by several months. He arrived at Sydney on 21 July 1838, sailing to Australia on the Bengal Merchant and went to work at Illawarra.

He was given a ticket-of-leave in 1845 for the Windsor District and later that year began hawking before settling in Ipswich in 1847. He became a store-keeper in Ipswich and received a conditional pardon on 20 October 1849, eventually becoming a successful merchant.

On 7 May 1851 he married Mary Real (died 1925) and together had seven sons and six daughters. O'Sullivan died of a stroke at his Woodend home and was buried in the Ipswich General Cemetery.

Public career
O'Sullivan, along with Frederick Forbes and three time premier of Queensland, Arthur Macalister, won the three positions for the electoral district of Ipswich at the inaugural 1860 Queensland election. O'Sullivan was defeated at the 1863 election and four years later won a position on the electoral district of West Moreton, also a three-member seat. He remained the member for just over a year, being defeated at the 1868 Queensland election.

He was then out of politics until 1876 when, following the resignation of James Parker, he won the seat of Burke at the 1876 by-election. He did not stand for re-election for Burke and instead won the seat of Stanley in 1878 before being defeated in 1883. He won the seat of Stanley again at the 
1888 Queensland colonial election before retiring from politics in 1893.

His son, Thomas O'Sullivan, was a member of the Queensland Legislative Council and his grandson, Neil O'Sullivan, was a senator in the federal parliament.

References

Members of the Queensland Legislative Assembly
1818 births
1904 deaths
19th-century Australian politicians
Irish emigrants to colonial Australia